"Phir Bhi Tumko Chaahunga" is an Indian Hindi-language song from the Indian film Half Girlfriend. Picturised on Shraddha Kapoor and Arjun Kapoor, the song has been sung by Arijit Singh and Shashaa Tirupati. The music of the song is composed by Mithoon and the lyrics are penned by Manoj Muntashir. Reprise version of the track is sung by Arijit Singh titled, "Pal Bhar (Chaahunga Reprise)", and also another female version titled, "Phir Bhi Tumko Chaahungi" is sung by Shraddha Kapoor along with the instrumental "Half Girlfriend (Love Theme)".

Background
The song was written in Nazm style in 2001 by the writer Manoj Muntashir, while he was working for the TV show Yatra. Muntashir wrote the Nazm in his diary at Dal Lake in Kashmir while thinking of his wife. The song was then forgotten for years until music composer Ankit Tiwari heard about it and insisted that he use it. Muntashir was hesitant to use it in films, but later submitted on the insistence of film director Mohit Suri. As Mohit Suri believed if produced properly the song would be a "Historical". According to Muntashir, "Mohit told Mithoon to compose the music and it was beautiful. The credit has to go to Mithoon for bringing it to Mohit's notice."

Pre-release
The track registered over 4 million views through unofficial versions and remixes, even before the song's official release. Muntashir said, ‛he can't believe how much of an impact just two lines of the song have created.’

Reception

India Today wrote that "Phir Bhi Tumko Chaahunga" is "sung in the soulful voice of Arijit Singh" and that it "has romance written all over it. The song beautifully puts across feeling of unconditional love" Times of India'''s Pratibha D. wrote, "Arijit Singh weaves magic yet again. The music for the movie is given by renowned music composer Mithoon, whose romantic touch in tracks just takes you into another world." NDTV Movies wrote, "'Phir Bhi Tumko Chahunga' is a soulful rendition by Arijit Singh."

Writer of the song Manoj Muntashir said, "I would like to mention, Mithoon has done what i always thought was impossible. Without changing one word from the original poetry, he made a tune India is shedding tears and spilling cans of beer over. It's a craze because of Mithoon's genius." Director of the film Mohit Suri said, "I'm taken aback by the quantum of love and the amount of anticipation around the song. As my reciprocation I would like to present the song to my audiences sooner than scheduled. Mithoon, Arijit, and me are overwhelmed by all the love."Radioandmusic.com'' wrote "'Phir Bhi Tumko Chaahunga' features soulful vocals by Arijit Singh, which will surely soothe the soul. Revealing just a small verse of the song, was enough for music lovers and the singer's fans to start to love it. The song was an instant hit among the audiences and fans and music lovers have already made several covers of the song, which seem to have gone viral already. Following this, the makers have decided to treat their fans by preponing the song release and give out the full original track."

Accolades

References

2017 songs
Songs written for films
Hindi film songs
Songs with lyrics by Manoj Muntashir
Arijit Singh songs
Songs written by Mithoon